The  (French) or  (Dutch), meaning "Northern Passage", is a glazed shopping arcade in central Brussels, Belgium. It was built in 1881–82 in an eclectic style by Henri Rieck, following the covering of the Senne and the creation of the Central Boulevards. It is decorated with 32 caryatids in the neoclassical style by Jean-François-Joseph Bertheux and sculptures and putti by Constant Albert Desenfants.

The gallery is located between the Rue Neuve/Nieuwstraat and the Boulevard Adolphe Max/Adolphe Maxlaan. It is served by the metro and premetro (underground tram) station De Brouckère on lines 1, 3, 4 and 5.

History
The Northern Passage was erected in 1881–82 according to the plans of the architect Henri Rieck at the request of the Société anonyme du Musée et du Passage du Nord. The project focused on the development of the Central Boulevards and the new shopping gallery was to constitute a direct and covered link between the Place De Brouckère/De Brouckèreplein and the / (today's Boulevard Adolphe Max/Adolphe Maxlaan) with the Rue Neuve/Nieuwstraat.

Executed in an eclectic style and inaugurated on 25 May 1882, the gallery was lined at that time with 34 shops and a museum on the ground floor, while the upper floors were reserved for all kinds of cultural activities. The monumental facades are richly decorated, notably with sculptures by Joseph Berteux and Albert Desenfants. At the beginning of the 21st century, there are only 20 stores left as a result of some amalgamations of stores. The halls of the museum are now used as seminar rooms, a fitness room and rooms of the Hotel Métropole.

Certain parts of the Northern Passage, namely the facades on the street side, the interior facades, the domed glass roof and the floors were designated a historic monument on 13 April 1995.

Gallery

See also
 Arcade galleries in Brussels
 History of Brussels
 Belgium in "the long nineteenth century"

References

Notes

Bibliography

External links

 Official website

Shopping malls in Brussels
City of Brussels
Protected heritage sites in Brussels
Tourist attractions in Brussels
Arcades (architecture)